Onias III ( Ḥōnīyyō), son of Simon II, was Jewish High Priest during the Second Temple period. He is described in scriptures as a pious man who opposed the Hellenization of Judea. He was succeeded by his brother Jason in 175 BCE.

Politics of the office
The Seleucid Empire controlled Jerusalem during Onias' tenure and Seleucus IV Philopator (reigned 187–175 BCE) was friendly to the Jews and defrayed all expenses connected with their sanctuary. According to 2 Maccabees, a Hellenizing official of the Temple, Simon, a member of the Tribe of Benjamin, induced Seleucus through his official Heliodorus to plunder the Temple. The attempt was unsuccessful and the court never forgave the High Priest. When Antiochus IV Epiphanes became king in 175 BCE, Onias was obliged to yield to his own brother, Jason, a Hellenizer. According to Josephus, Jason became high priest after the death of Onias, the latter's son being then a minor. Josephus strangely identifies the high priest who succeeded Jason as the brother of Onias and Jason, likewise was called Onias, asserting that he did not assume the name of Menelaus until later; for according to this statement there must have been two brothers of the same name. While this confusion may be due to the Greek transcription of the related Hebrew names Johanan, Honiyya, and Nehonya, the account of Josephus appears wholly unreliable for this very reason.

According to II Macc. iv. 26, Menelaus was not an Aaronite, but brother of Simon and thus also a Benjaminite. When Menelaus removed some vessels from the Temple to curry favor with the Syrian nobles of the Seleucid Empire, Onias accused him publicly and then fled to the asylum of Daphne, near Antioch, where Menelaus, aided by the royal governor Andronicus, had him secretly assassinated, in defiance of justice and of his oath.  According to 2 Maccabees, the murdered Onias III was deeply mourned by both Jews and Greeks, and the king also, on his return, wept for him and sentenced Andronicus to death.

Wellhausen and Willrich regard the story of the murder of Onias, as well as the entire list of high priests from Jaddua to the Maccabees, as legendary, while Emil Schürer and Benedikt Niese consider them historical. The passages in Daniel 8:10–11 ("casting down some of the host and stars...the prince of the host"),  9:26 ("shall Messiah be cut off, but not for himself") and 11:22 ("...and shall be broken; yea, also the prince of the covenant") are generally referred to the murder of Onias. Onias III is the central figure of the legendary history of later times; the Byzantine Chronicon Paschale says he officiated for twenty-four years, thus placing the beginning of his term of office under Egyptian rule. The Byzantine Chronographeion Syntomon follows Josephus in mentioning "another Onias" as the successor of Onias III., referring probably to Menelaus.  According to Martin Hengel, Onias III was seen as too friendly to the Ptolemies by the Seleucid leadership to explain his replacement.  Hengel is also skeptical of Jason of Cyrene and 2 Maccabees portraying Onias III as a devout Jew and his brother Jason as a Hellenizer: The fact Onias III retreated to the shrine of Apollo and Artemis at Daphne suggests he was not as zealous for keeping Jewish law as 2 Maccabees would suggest, which portrays Onias III's replacement as part of a Seleucid attack on Judaism.

Patrilineal ancestry

See also
Onias IV

References

Resources
Gottheil, Richard and Samuel Krauss. "Onias." Jewish Encyclopedia. Funk and Wagnalls, 1901–1906, which cites the following bibliography: 
H. P. Chajes, Beiträge zur Nordsemitischen Onomatologie, p. 23, Vienna, 1900 (on the name);
Herzfeld, Gesch. des Volkes Jisrael, i. 185-189, 201-206;
Heinrich Grätz, Gesch. 2d ed., ii. 236;
Emil Schürer, Gesch. 3d ed., i. 182, 194-196; iii. 97-100;
Niese, in Hermes, xxxv. 509;
Julius Wellhausen, Israelitische und jüdische Geschichte, 4th ed., p. 248, Berlin, 1901;
, Juden und Griechen vor der Makkabäischen Erhebung, pp. 77, 109, Göttingen, 1895;
Adolf Büchler, Die Tobiaden und die Oniaden, pp. 166, 240, 275, 353, Vienna, 1899;
J. P. Mahaffy, The Empire of the Ptolemies, pp. 217, 353, London, 1895;
Heinrich Gelzer, Sextus Julius Africanus, ii. 170-176, Leipsic, 1885;
Isaac Hirsch Weiss, Dor, i. 130 (on the halakic view of the temple of Onias).

2nd-century BCE High Priests of Israel
Seleucid Jews